Lizia Oliveira (born November 17, 1985) is a Brazilian journalist and author who has worked in several areas of the communications field, including online and print journalism and public relations.

Education 
In 2007, Lizia graduated top of her class in the Federal University of Rio Grande do Norte, one of the most prestigious universities of northeastern Brazil. In January 2011, she received her Masters of Science degree in Applied Communications from Fitchburg State University (Fitchburg-MA), where she is now pursuing her Certificate of Advanced Graduate Studies (CAGS) in Public Relations and Applied Communications.

Work 
Lizia has published articles at local newspapers such as Tribuna do Norte (Natal-RN-Brazil) and The Metrowest Daily News in Framingham, Massachusetts. She also worked for the Center for Digital Inclusion, an international organization based in Brazil, and Community Health Connections (Fitchburg-MA).

Personal life 
Oliveira was born in Itaberaba, Bahia, Brazil. As the daughter of a pastor, Lizia grew up with a missionaries' life style, moving from place to place throughout her childhood. At 12, she authored her first book, Além da Fuga, a children's book about a girl that runs away from home.

She emigrated to the United States in 2009 to pursue her career as a journalist. That same year she started working for the Metrowest Daily News.

References 

1985 births
Living people
Brazilian emigrants to the United States
Brazilian women journalists
People from Bahia
Fitchburg State University alumni